Cruz de los Caminos, formerly named Cuchilla de Caraguatá or Caraguatá is a village in the Tacuarembó Department of Uruguay. It took its original name from a nearby range of hills, known as the Cuchilla de Caraguatá. The word 'Caraguatá' refers to a local plant and is also the name of a nearby stream.

Geography

Population
In 2011 Cruz de los Caminos had a population of 463. No former census had given results for this location.

Public schools
In Cruz de los Caminos is Public School 61, while  to its west, on Route 6 is Public School 26, next to the police station.

References

Populated places in the Tacuarembó Department